Burhani-Hagigat was a Azerbaijani literary, socio-political magazine, the first printed organ in the Azerbaijani language, published in Yerevan since the closure of the Lek-Lek magazine, which was also published in Azerbaijani. Published in Yerevan from January 1 (14) to June 29 (July 12), 1917. The magazine was printed twice a month on 8 pages and 9 issues were issued in total. The name consists of the Arabic words Burhan (Proof) and Hagigat (Truth).

Publication 
On January 1 (14), 1917, under the direction and editorship of the poet, publicist Ali Mahzun Rahimov and  Erivan intelligentsia's publishing house representative Hasan Mirzazade Aliyev, the first issue of the magazine “Burhani-Hagigat” was published.

Authors 
The authors of the magazine were Jabbar Askerzade (Adzhiz), Mirza Jabbar Mammadov, Rahim Naji, Vahid Muganli, Tahvil Irevani, as well as the poetesses Shohrat, Nigar, Sariya Khanum, Abdulhag Mehrinisa, Fatma Mufida, Ramziyya and others, among whom were also students of Erivan teachers' seminary. Most of them were comin from Molla Nasraddin tradition.

Content 
Articles about social and political issues occupied a large place in the magazine, but in addition to them, issues of home economics and parenting were also published. Starting from the second issue, Ali Makhzun's work "On Literature" was published in the journal. In 2012, the literary critic Shafag Nasir transcribed all issues of the journal.

References

Source 
 
 

1917 establishments in Russia
1917 disestablishments in Russia
Magazines published in Russia
Azerbaijani-language magazines
Magazines established in 1917
Magazines disestablished in 1917
Satirical magazines published in Russia